The Royal Challengers Bangalore (RCB) is a franchise cricket team based in Bangalore, India, which plays in the Indian Premier League (IPL). They are one of the eight teams which are taking part in the 2017 Indian Premier League. They are captained by Virat Kohli and coached by Daniel Vettori.
This was one of the most difficult seasons for RCB, as when it started their key players were injured and missed initial matches. Shane Watson had taken responsibility of captaining RCB .

Season standings

Auction
The player auction for the 2017 Indian Premier League was held on 20 February in Bangalore. Five players were signed by the franchise.
Pawan Negi
Tymal Mills
Aniket Choudhary
Praveen Dubey
Billy Stanlake

Squad
 Players with international caps are listed in bold.

Administration and support staff
The team is owned by Diageo through United Spirits Limited. Amrit Thomas, acts as the director of team. Retired Indian cricketer Brijesh Patel, serves as the CEO for the team. Russell Adams is the vice president for commercial operations. Avinash Vaidya is the team manager.
Daniel Vettori heads the coaching team which consists of Allan Donald (bowling coach), Trent Woodhill (batting and fielding coach), Even Speechly (physio) and Shankar Basu (strength and condition coach).

Records this year (2017) 
23 April was the highest total runs (263/5) in IPL by RCB (2013). Also at the same date they scored the lowest runs (49/10) in IPL.

Season

References

External links
 

Royal Challengers Bangalore seasons
2010s in Bangalore
2017 Indian Premier League